Mucinoses are a group of cutaneous diseases caused by fibroblasts producing abnormally large amounts of acid mucopolysaccharides (i.e. mucin), usually hyaluronic acid.

Cutaneous mucinosis is a group of conditions involving an accumulation of mucin or glycosaminoglycan in the skin and its annexes. It is described in some connective tissue diseases but never in association with mixed connective tissue disease.

See also 
 Skin lesion
 List of cutaneous conditions

References

External links 
 Hyaluronic Acid

Mucinoses